Bungarus sindanus, the Sind krait, is a species of krait, a  venomous elapid snake found in India, Iran, Bangladesh,  Nepal, and Pakistan. Three subspecies are recognized. It can be confused with the common krait.

Description
Their most visible feature is their narrow white bands, though the bands can be either yellow or grey depending on the color variation. The young have white spots on one-third of their body instead of bands (which develop at maturity). They have an egg-shaped head with a short snout, small eyes, upper lips either yellow or white and pointed tip tail. Dorsal scales are smooth and glossy with the vertebral row enlarged and hexagonal. Dorsal scale count 19 ( 21 ) - 17 ( 19 ) - 17.

Behavior
Sind kraits are primarily nocturnal, and often (unintentionally) cross paths with humans and domestic animals. It is estimated that around 30-40% of the annually recorded snake bites within Bangladesh are from Sind kraits. Usually, people who are bitten simply don’t see the animal; its camouflage, colouring and temporarily remaining still are generally enough to protect it, lest it be so effective that they are accidentally stepped on. This is when the krait reacts in a scared manner, striking. Other instances involve a krait inadvertently showing itself, causing people to overreact. When they attempt to scare or kill the krait, they end up being bitten.

Distribution and habitat
B. sindanus is found throughout Bangladesh, India, Nepal, and Pakistan. Within India, specifically, it has been recorded in the states of Bihar, Gujarat, Haryana, Jharkhand, Madhya Pradesh, Maharashtra, Punjab, Rajasthan, Uttar Pradesh, and West Bengal (Jalpaiguri and Midnapur districts). The overall geographic ranges of the subspecies are:

Bungarus sindanus razai Khan, 1985 - northern Pakistan. 
Bungarus sindanus sindanus Boulenger, 1897 - southern Pakistan, adjacent India. Type locality: Sindh, West Pakistan.

Etymology
It is known as the Sindh or Sind krait after being originally discovered in the Sindh province, Pakistan.

The subspecific name walli is in honour of British herpetologist Frank Wall, who named the taxon after himself, admitting that it was a "breach of ethics" to do so.

References

Further reading
Boulenger GA (1897). "A new krait from Sind (Bungarus sindanus)". J. Bombay Nat. Hist. Soc. 11: 73–74.
Kuch, Ulrich (2004). Bungarus sindanus Boulenger, 1897, an addition to the venomous snake fauna of Afghanistan". Herpetozoa 16 (3/4): 171–173.
Vyas, Raju (1998). "Unusual marking pattern in krait Bungarus sindanus ". Cobra 32: 34–35.
Wall F (1907). "A new krait from Oudh (Bungarus walli)". J. Bombay Nat. Hist. Soc. 17: 155–157.

External links
 

sindanus
Reptiles of India
Reptiles of Pakistan
Reptiles of Sindh
Reptiles described in 1897